Anticarsia gemmatalis is a tropical species of caterpillar and moth that migrates north each season. The species can commonly be found in the Gulf states, north as far as Wisconsin. The adults have wings that are grayish brown, crossed with brown or black zigzag lines. The caterpillars are black or green, with narrow lighter stripes on the back and sides. They spit out a brownish substance, spring into the air and wriggle a lot when they are disturbed. The species eats velvet beans, peanut, soybeans, cotton, kudzu, alfalfa, cowpeas, horse beans, snap beans, lima beans, and coffeeweeds. Its common name is velvetbean caterpillar and velvetbean moth.

This suggests global warming will reduce A. gemmatalis losses on soybeans in tropical areas that are already at  but increase predation on soybeans in areas currently below that temperature, thus in fact only shifting the affected area.

References

External links
 Velvetbean caterpillar on the University of Florida / Institute of Food and Agricultural Sciences Featured Creatures website
 
 
 

Catocalinae
Moths of North America
Moths described in 1818